Tumsar Municipal Council is a municipal local body administrating Tumsar City in Bhandara district of Maharashtra, India.

See also

 Bhandara Municipal Council

Municipal councils in Maharashtra
Bhandara district